Rick L. Edgeman (born 1954 in Pueblo, Colorado - USA) is an American statistician and quality professional, and Professor of Sustainability & Performance at AU Herning and in the Interdisciplinary Center for Organizational Architecture, at Aarhus University, School of Business and Social Sciences. Concurrently, he is President's Distinguished Scholar, Professor & Chair of Management, and Center for Entrepreneurship Director in the Robbins College of Business & Entrepreneurship at Fort Hays State University in Hays, Kansas. He is primarily known for his work on Quality Management, Performance Management, and within recent years Sustainable Enterprise Excellence (SEE). He is an Academician of the International Academy of Quality.

Biography 
Before Aarhus University prior posts include Statistical Science Department Professor & Chair at the University of Idaho (2004-2011), QUEST Professor & QUEST Honors Program Executive Director in the Robert H. Smith School of Business at the University of Maryland (2001-2004), Professor of Computer Information Systems & Director of the Center for Quality & Productivity Improvement (CQPI) at Colorado State University (1988-2001), and early career stints at the University of North Texas, Bradley University, and in the Center for Quality & Applied Statistics at the Rochester Institute of Technology. A Six Sigma Black Belt, Rick was a Visiting Professor in the Faculty of Management & Economics at Tomas Bata University in the Czech Republic, Leicester Castle Business School of De Montfort University in the United Kingdom, the Quality Sciences Division at Uppsala University in Sweden, Quality & Environmental Management Division at Luleå University (Sweden), and University of Lugano in Switzerland, Invited Professor at the Versailles Business School, University of Versailles Saint-Quentin en Yvelines (France), and Honorary Professor Professor of Engineering Operations Management in the Department of Technology & Innovation at Southern Denmark University. Invited lectures and keynotes include ones at Oxford University, the Royal Melbourne Institute of Technology, and on behalf of the National Science Foundation. In 1992 he was a Special Congressional Fulbright Senior Scholar under the Securing Eastern European Democracy (SEED) Program to Comenius University in Czechoslovakia, although delayed notification prevented appointment acceptance.

EDUCATION
 2019 - Cornell University - Systems Thinking
 2004 - Villanova University (USA) - Six Sigma Black Belt 
 1983 - University of Wyoming (USA) - Ph.D. Statistics
 1979 - University of Northern Colorado (USA) - M.S. Research & Statistical Methods 
 1977 - Colorado State University-Pueblo (USA) - B.S. Experimental Psychology

Work 
Edgeman's research addresses quality, innovation, consciousness, six sigma innovation & design, sustainability, and statistical methods for quality & reliability engineering  He has served on the Editorial Review Boards of Total Quality Management & Business Excellence, The Six Sigma Forum, Quality Engineering, International Journal of Product Development, International Journal of Manufacturing Technology & Management, International Journal of Business Performance Management, and the Business & Entrepreneurship Journal.   He has delivered conference keynote addresses in Australia, Canada, the Czech Republic, Denmark, Ireland, New Zealand, Spain, Sweden, and elsewhere.

Selected publications 
 Edgeman, Rick. "Complex Management Systems & the Shingo Model: Foundations of Operational Excellence & Supporting Tools". Routledge Taylor & Francis Group. 290 pp. (2019)
 Edgeman, Rick. "Strategic resistance for sustaining enterprise relevance: A paradigm for sustainable enterprise excellence, resilience and robustness", International Journal of Productivity and Performance Management, Vol. 64 Iss: 3, p. 318 (2015)
 Edgeman, Rick; Williams, Joseph A. "Enterprise self-assessment analytics for sustainability, resilience and robustness", The TQM Journal, Vol. 26 Iss: 4, p. 368 (2014)
 Edgeman, Rick L.; Eskildsen, Jacob."Modeling and Assessing Sustainable Enterprise Excellence", Business Strategy and the Environment, Vol. 33 Iss: 3, p. 173 (2013)
 Edgeman, Rick. "Sustainable Enterprise Excellence: towards a framework for holistic data-analytics", Corporate Governance, Vol. 13 Iss: 5, p. 527 (2013)
 Edgeman, Rick L.; Klefsjö, Bengt; and Wiklund, Håkan. "Six Sigma Seen as a Methodology for Total Quality Management", Measuring Business Excellence, Vol. 5, Iss: 1, p. 31 (2001)
 Edgeman, Rick L.."BEST business excellence:: an expanded view", Measuring Business Excellence, Vol. 4 Iss: 4, p. 15 (2000)

Link to full list of publications

References

External links 
 Rick Edgeman at Aarhus University.

1954 births
Living people
American business theorists
Academic staff of Aarhus University